Anselmo Fuerte Abelenda (born 27 January 1962 in Madrid) is a former Spanish racing cyclist. He finished third in the 1988 and  1990 Vuelta a España.

Major results

1984
 1st Overall Vuelta a la Comunidad de Madrid
1986
 3rd Overall Vuelta a Burgos
 4th Overall Tour of the Basque Country
1st Stage 4
 4th Overall Volta Ciclista a Catalunya
 5th Overall Route du Sud
 9th Overall Vuelta a España
 9th Overall Critérium International
1987
 1st Overall Vuelta a Aragón
 3rd Overall Vuelta a Asturias
 7th Overall Vuelta a España
 8th Overall Tour de France
1988
 2nd Overall Setmana Catalana de Ciclisme
 3rd Overall Vuelta a España
 8th Overall Tour of the Basque Country
1990
 3rd Overall Vuelta a España
1991
 2nd Overall Setmana Catalana de Ciclisme
1992
 6th Overall Vuelta a Andalucía

External links

References

1962 births
Living people
Spanish male cyclists
Cyclists from Madrid